Yu Dan (born August 18, 1987 in Sichuan, China) is a female Chinese sport shooter.

Yu won the bronze medal in the 10m air rifle at the 2012 Summer Olympics.

See also 
 China at the 2012 Summer Olympics

References

External links
 
 
 

1987 births
Living people
Chinese female sport shooters
ISSF rifle shooters
Olympic shooters of China
Olympic bronze medalists for China
Shooters at the 2012 Summer Olympics
Olympic medalists in shooting
People from Neijiang
Sport shooters from Sichuan
Asian Games medalists in shooting
Medalists at the 2012 Summer Olympics
Shooters at the 2010 Asian Games
Universiade medalists in shooting
Asian Games gold medalists for China
Medalists at the 2010 Asian Games
Universiade gold medalists for China
Universiade silver medalists for China
Medalists at the 2013 Summer Universiade
21st-century Chinese women